Lincoln Paul LaVinn (January 2, 1915 – August 10, 1975) was an American football, basketball, and baseball coach.

Coaching career

Carthage
LaVinn was the 12th head football coach at Carthage College in Carthage, Illinois, serving  for two seasons, from 1945 to 1946, and compiling a record of 2–10–1.  LaVinn started out with a win against Parsons College in Iowa and outscored opponents by 59 to 46 in his inaugural 1945 season, but ended up with a winless season in his second year of coaching.

While at Carthage, LaVinn also coached the baseball team in 1947 to a 2–7 record, and found somewhat more success as the men's basketball coach for three seasons, from 1946 to 1948, with a record of 26–37.

Eureka
LaVinn was the seventh head football coach at Eureka College  in Eureka, Illinois, serving for four seasons, from 1949 to 1951, and compilinga  record of 4–17–1.

LaVinn also coached the men's basketball team at Eureka for four seasons, from 1948 to 1952, tallying a mark of 44–38.

High school coaching
In August 1952, LaVinn was hired as the athletic director at Lockport Township High School in  Lockport, Illinois.  In additional to Lockport, he also coached at school in Maple Park, and New Lenox.

Later life and death
LaVinn moved in 1975 from Downer's Grove, Illinois to Largo, Florida.  He died on August 10, 1975.

Head coaching record

Football

References

1915 births
1975 deaths
Carthage Firebirds baseball coaches
Carthage Firebirds men's basketball coaches
Carthage Firebirds football coaches
Eureka Red Devils football coaches
Eureka Red Devils men's basketball coaches
Upper Iowa Peacocks football coaches
Upper Iowa Peacocks men's basketball coaches
High school football coaches in Illinois
People from Whitehall, Wisconsin